Ectons are explosive electron emissions observed as individual packets or avalanches of electrons, occurring as microexplosions at the cathode. The electron current in an ecton starts flowing as a result of overheating of the metal cathode because of the high energy density (104Jg−1), and stops when the emission zone cools off.

Ectons occur in plasma-involving phenomena, such as: electrical discharges in vacuum, cathode spots of vacuum arcs, volumetric discharges in gases, pseudosparks, coronas, unipolar arcs, etc.

An ecton consists of individual portions of electrons (1011– 1012 particles). The formation time is of the order of nanoseconds.

See also
List of plasma (physics) articles

Sources
Ectons and their role in plasma processes

Electron